Pain Bolgur (also Romanized as Pā’īn Bolgūr; also known as Pā’īn Bowlgūr) is a village in Markiyeh Rural District, Mirza Kuchek Janghli District, Sowme'eh Sara County, Gilan Province, Iran. At the 2006 census, its population was 390, in 112 families.

References 

Populated places in Sowme'eh Sara County